The Gums is a rural town and locality in the Western Downs Region, Queensland, Australia.

Geography 

The Glenmorgan railway line passes through the locality from east (Tara) to west (Hannaford). In 2017, there were three stations serving the locality: The Gums railway station (which is north of but close to the town), Cabawin railway station, and South Glen railway station. However, in 2019, only The Gums railway station is listed as still operational.

History 
The name of the town was derived from The Gums railway station, on the Glenmorgan railway line from Dalby to Glenmorgan, used from 1924.

South Glen Provisional School opened in 1913 and closed circa 1921.

The Gums State School opened on 27 January 1913.

In 1914 a Methodist church was built at The Gums.

Cabawin Provisional School opened on 30 January 1934. In 1952 it became Cabawin State School. It closed in 1960. It was on Cabawin South Road.

Education 

The Gums State School is a government primary (Prep-6) school for boys and girls at 12051 Coomrith Road. In 2017, the school had an enrolment of 22 students with 4 teachers (2 full-time equivalent) and 5 non-teaching staff (2 full-time equivalent).

There is no secondary school in The Gums. The nearest secondary school is Tara Shire State College in Tara.

Facilities 

The Gums has a small cemetery. One of the headstones is for the first headmaster of The Gums State School, Alexander Davison who died on 7 November 1916.

References

External links 

 

Towns in Queensland
Western Downs Region
Darling Downs
Localities in Queensland